Camille is a 1926 American silent film based on the play adaptation of La Dame aux Camélias (The Lady of the Camellias) by Alexandre Dumas, fils, first published in French as a novel in 1848 and as a play in 1852. Adapted by Fred de Gresac, George Marion Jr., Olga Printzlau, and Chandler Sprague, Camille was a directed by Fred Niblo and starred Norma Talmadge as Camille and Gilbert Roland as her lover, Armand. It was produced by the Norma Talmadge Film Corporation and released by First National Pictures. The film's score was composed by William Axt.

Preservation status
An incomplete 35mm positive print exists in the Raymond Rohauer collection of the Cohen Media Group, according to silentera.com.

Cast
 Norma Talmadge – Marguerite Gautier, Camille
 Gilbert Roland – Armand
 Lilyan Tashman – Olympe
 Rose Dione – Prudence
 Oscar Beregi, Sr. – Count de Varville
 Harvey Clark – The Baaron
 Helen Jerome Eddy – Camille's maid
 Alec B. Francis – the Duke
 Albert Conti – Henri
 Michael Visaroff – Camille's Father
 Evelyn Selbie – Camille's Mother
 Etta Lee – Mataloti
 Maurice Costello – Armand's father

References

External links
 
 
 
 
Film poster(Wayback)

1926 films
1926 drama films
American silent feature films
Films based on Camille
American black-and-white films
American films based on plays
Films directed by Fred Niblo
First National Pictures films
Films based on adaptations
Silent American drama films
Films produced by Joseph M. Schenck
1920s American films